Sladka Gora is a settlement in the Municipality of Šmarje pri Jelšah in eastern Slovenia. It lies in the hills to the north of Šmarje. The area is part of the traditional region of Styria. The municipality is now included in the Savinja Statistical Region.

It is best known for its parish church, a pilgrimage church with a double spire dedicated to the Virgin Mary and Saint Margaret. It belongs to the Roman Catholic Diocese of Celje. It was built between 1744 and 1754.

References

External links
Sladka Gora at Geopedia

Populated places in the Municipality of Šmarje pri Jelšah